The 1951 Iowa State Cyclones football team represented Iowa State College of Agricultural and Mechanic Arts (later renamed Iowa State University) in the Big Seven Conference during the 1951 college football season. In their fifth year under head coach Abe Stuber, the Cyclones compiled a 4–4–1 record (2–4 against conference opponents), tied for fourth place in the conference, and were outscored by their opponents by a combined total of 216 to 211. They played their home games at Clyde Williams Field in Ames, Iowa.

The team's regular starting lineup on offense consisted of left end Mal Schmidt, left tackle Jack Lessin, left guard Stan Campbell, center Rollie Arns, right guard Carl Brettschneider, right tackle Bob Mateson, right end Bob Voetberg, quarterback Dick Mann, left halfback Dick Cherpinsky, right halfback Frank Congiardo, and fullback Maury Schnell. Stan Campbell was the team captain.

The team's statistical leaders included Frank Congiardo with 315 rushing yards, Rich Mann with 1,296 passing yards, Mal Schmidt with 547 receiving yards, and Stan Cozzi with 36 points (six touchdowns) each. Three Iowa State players were selected as first-team all-conference players: Stan Campbell, Rich Mann, and Mal Schmidt.

Schedule

References

Iowa State
Iowa State Cyclones football seasons
Iowa State Cyclones football